Syracuse Hancock International Airport  is a joint civil–military airport five miles (8 km) northeast of downtown Syracuse, New York, and  south of Watertown. Operated by the Syracuse Department of Aviation, it is located off Interstate 81, near Mattydale. The main terminal complex is at the east end of Colonel Eileen Collins Boulevard.  Half of the airport is located within the Town of DeWitt, with portions in the towns of Salina and Cicero.

The National Plan of Integrated Airport Systems for 2011–2015 called it a primary commercial service airport.

History 
In 1927, Syracuse mayor Charles Hanna felt his city needed an airport. Land in the Amboy section of the nearby town of Camillus was purchased for $50,000, and by 1928, the "Syracuse City Airport at Amboy" was handling airmail.

With the start of World War II, the airport was pressed into service as a flight training center for the Army Air Forces. By 1942, it had become apparent that Amboy Airport was not large enough to handle military needs. As a replacement, the AAF opened Syracuse Army Air Base in Mattydale. At the end of World War II the AAF leased the base to the city. On September 17, 1949, the Clarence E. Hancock Airport (named for the area's Congressman) opened to the public using a renovated machine shop as a terminal, and replaced the airport at Amboy.

American, Buffalo, Colonial and Robinson Airlines were the first airlines at the airport. The April 1957 OAG shows 50 weekday departures: 30 on American, eight on Eastern and 12 on Mohawk. Nonstops didn't reach west past Buffalo or south past New York; Syracuse didn't get a Chicago nonstop until 1967. In the mid-1970s the airport was dominated by Mohawk's successor Allegheny Airlines, with some competition from Eastern and American.

During this time Syracuse experienced massive growth and had to expand many times to handle additional passengers, this led to Syracuse becoming the second largest airport in Upstate New York by passenger volume and the largest by number of flights. At its height, 3.17 million passengers passed through the airport.

Utica-based Empire Airlines emerged as a regional competitor to Allegheny's successor USAir by the early 1980s. Empire planned to move its headquarters to Syracuse, but these plans were cancelled when Piedmont Airlines acquired Empire in 1986. After a legal battle with the city, Piedmont agreed to maintain a hub operation at the airport and advance funds for construction of a new terminal concourse. USAir acquired Piedmont in 1989, becoming the airport's dominant carrier, but dismantled the Syracuse hub in the 1990s, leading to the closure of several gates.

 

The largest aircraft ever to visit Syracuse was in 1996 when an AN-124 of Antonov Airlines flew a cargo flight from Vienna.  A British Airways Concorde made a scheduled landing at the airport on September 27, 1986.

The airport has a cargo facility served by Fedex Express and UPS.

Syracuse presently has no scheduled international service. It has seen commercial service to Canada at various times in its history, most recently in October 2018.

Facilities 
It has two asphalt runways: 10/28 is 9,003 by 150 feet (2,744 × 46 m) and 15/33 is 7,500 by 150 feet (2,286 × 46 m).

The east–west instrument runway (10-28) was extended from its original 5,500 feet by the mid-1950s to 6,863 feet and about 1958 to 8,000 feet. In 1958 the instrument landing system to runway 28 was augmented with a 3,000-foot high-intensity-approach lighting system. With the use of the Century series fighter aircraft by the Air Force, around 1960 the main east–west runway was extended again, to 9,005 feet. The runway was strengthened in the early 1960s for the heavier Boeing 707. In the 1960s runway centerline lighting was added to the main runway and touchdown zone lighting on the runway 28 end. In the summer months of 2020, the east–west runway 10-28 was resurfaced except for the end of 10 which includes the touchdown zone of 28, as this portion intersects runway 15/33 and would make construction difficult due to air traffic.

Around the time of building the new terminal building, runway 6-24 was shortened to 3,261 feet (to make room for the entrance road to the new terminal) and continued to be a general aviation runway into the 1970s, and was later abandoned. Runway 14-32 was lengthened in the 1960s to 6,000 feet. Another extension brought it to 6,480 feet and sometime around 1980 to its present length of 7,500 feet. The crosswind runway was renumbered from 14–32 to 15–33. An instrument landing system was added to runway 10 with medium-intensity-approach lighting with runway alignment indicator lights. Runway 15 got a medium-intensity-approach lighting system.

In the year ending August 31, 2017, the airport had 69,087 aircraft operations, average 189 per day: 30% air taxi, 29% airline, 11% military, and 30% general aviation. 43 aircraft were then based at this airport: 27 single-engine, 8 multi-engine, 5 jet, and 3 helicopter.

Operations 

Syracuse receives an average  of snow annually, most of any major city in the United States. On average, the airport is closed less than 24 hours annually due to snowfall. The airport has received the Balchen/Post Award for Excellence in the Performance of Snow and Ice Control eight times, most recently in 2012–2013. Runway 28 allows for Category II instrument landing system (ILS).

Recent expansion and growth 

In 2013 the airport's two concourses were connected airside along with the opening of a new centralized security checkpoint.

In November 2018, $62 million renovation efforts were completed on Syracuse's terminal. Renovations included larger windows and higher ceilings allowing more natural light, a brand new flight museum highlighting the history of aviation both locally and globally, renovated passenger bridges connecting the terminal to the parking garage, as well as more "modern" airline check-in areas. The project took approximately eight months to complete.

Southwest Airlines entered the Syracuse market for the first time in 2021 after the airport offered waive $1.5 million in fees and agreed to offer $150,000 in marketing assistance. Syracuse had been the only major upstate New York airport not served by Southwest.

On March 8, 2022, Breeze Airways began serving the airport.

On June 10, 2022 the airport announced intentions to create its own police department. Previously, the Syracuse Police Department provides police services to the airport with off-duty officers. The new police department began operations on March 6, 2023.

Future

The airport presently has several projects in planning or construction stages. Parking, which has reached capacity during recent peak travel times, is being expanded with new lots and a rebuild of the parking garage into two new garages. Car rental facilities will be moved from the terminal and parking garage to a new consolidated rental car facility and ground transportation center.

The airport's terminal and its two concourses will see additional boarding bridges and gate waiting area expansions. A new U.S. Customs and Border Protection facility will be built to replace a smaller, outdated one. An Escape Lounge is under construction and expected to be completed in April 2023.

Airlines and destinations

Passenger

Cargo 

In addition to these carriers SYR will occasionally be visited by a Cessna 208 of Castle Aviation.

Statistics

Top destinations

Annual traffic

Flight schools 
Syracuse Hancock International is home to Syracuse Flight School, formerly known as Waypoint Flight School.

The Syracuse Flying Club, based out of the MillionAir FBO, offers flight training.

See also 
 Hancock Field Air National Guard Base
 Syracuse Suburban Airport
 Syracuse Municipal Airport

References

External links 

 Historical Photos of the original airport at Amboy, as well as its current state
 Syracuse Hancock International (SYR) from New York State DOT airport directory
 Aerial image as of March 1995 from USGS The National Map
 
 

Airports in New York (state)
Airports established in 1928
Transportation in Syracuse, New York
Transportation in Onondaga County, New York
Buildings and structures in Onondaga County, New York
DeWitt, New York
1928 establishments in New York (state)